The Twins is a 1993 novel by Tessa de Loo about the sisters Lotte and Anna, who are separated at the age of six when their father dies. The story is set during World War II.

In 2002 the book was adapted to a film named Twin Sisters.

Plot 
In the autumn of 1990, 74-year-old Lotte Goudriaan spends several weeks in the spa town of Spa in the Belgian Ardennes. She suffers from osteoarthritis and the treatment she is taking is intended to relieve her pain. On the third day, she meets a German woman of her age in the restroom of the Thermal Institute. She is also on a cure because of worn joints. The woman turns out to be from Cologne, which is also the city where Lotte was born. It soon becomes clear that the German, Anna Grosalie, is Lotte's twin sister. When they were six years old, their parents died shortly after each other. The family then decided that Anna would be raised with an uncle and an aunt in the German countryside, while Lotte would be placed with the family of a cousin of the father in the Netherlands. Due to bad relations within the family, but especially because of the war, the two sisters lost touch with each other. After their forced separation, they only met twice, the last time right after the war.

1993 novels
20th-century Dutch novels
Dutch-language novels
Dutch historical novels
Dutch novels adapted into films
Novels set during World War II
Novels set in the Netherlands
Twins in fiction
Fictional twins
Female characters in literature